Dojnica (or Dojnicë, serbian: Дoјнице/Dojnice) is an abandoned village in the Prizren Municipality of Kosovo.

Population 

In 2011 Dojnica had no Inhabitants.

Notes

References

External links
 Location

Villages in Prizren